Eugene John Hebert was an American-born Jesuit missionary in Sri Lanka. He along with his Tamil driver Betram Francis disappeared on August 15, 1990 as the Sri Lankan civil war was raging. He went missing on his way to the eastern city of Batticaloa from a nearby town of Valaichchenai. He was known for his Human Rights activity on behalf of the local civilians. The Jesuits believe that he was killed along with his driver.

Biography
Eugene John Hebert was born in Jennings, Louisiana United States, on October 9, 1923. He joined the Jesuits on August 14, 1941 at the age of 17. After completion of Jesuit studies, he volunteered for the Sri Lanka Mission. He was accepted and arrived in September 1948. After serving a year in the eastern township of Batticaloa and another in Trincomalee at the Jesuit Colleges he went to Poona, India, for the study of Theology. He was ordained a priest on 24 March 1954.

After returning to Sri Lanka in April 1956, he was assigned to St Joseph’s College in Trincomalee as a teacher and sports coach from 1956 to 1978. He was named principal there for a brief period. In the 1960s, private schools including Catholic colleges were taken over by the State, and Hebert was sent to Batticaloa to work at the Eastern Technical Institute, the joint Jesuit and Methodist technical institute, as its director. He was also the basketball coach from 1978 to 1990 at St Michael’s College in Batticaloa, where he achieved national championship status over several years.

Hebert was a prominent member of the Batticaloa Peace Committee that has interceded on behalf of the many disappeared and missing people as part of the Sri Lankan civil war with both the Sri Lankan government officials and the rebel Liberation Tigers of Tamil Eelam (LTTE) group.

Incident
During the mid part of August in 1990, there were number of massacres and counter massacres of civilians targeting both the minority Muslim and Tamil communities. Perpetrators were alleged to be the rebel LTTE as well as government soldiers belonging to various divisions. Following the massacre of a group of Muslims in the Kathankudy Mosque, the situation at the nearby ethnically mixed town of Valachchenai became tense with unruly Muslim mobs roving around targeting Tamils. Most Tamils from Valachchenai fled to refugee camps in the provincial capital of Batticaloa leaving behind a group of Catholic sisters, some girls and helpers trapped in a convent.

The Bishop of Batticaloa sent Eugene Hebert on August 13 to Valachchenai to assist the trapped sisters and others as well as a security guarantee against an attack. On August 15, the Bishop of Batticaloa organized a security convoy from the city to bring back the trapped sisters and others. He informed Hebert to accompany the convoy on its way back from Valachchenai to Batticaloa. Instead Hebert informed the bishop that as the situation was getting better he would leave on his own via a circuitous route through an ethnically mixed town called Eravur to Batticaloa as he had urgent matters to take care at the institute where he was the director. Hebert along with a Tamil boy Betram Francis was last seen riding a red Vespa scooter towards Batticaloa via Eravur.

Reactions
Sri Lankan government
The Sri Lankan government believes that Hebert was killed by the rebel LTTE who were active around the Eravur area at the time of his disappearance. This apparently was in response to a written request for explanation by the local American Embassy.

Amnesty International
An Amnesty International report dated 1990 urged the Sri Lankan government to continue the investigation into the disappearance of Eugene Hebert. It noted that the local investigation by the local military authorities was inconclusive.

Jesuits
Local Jesuits such as Harry Miller believe that a mob of civilians may have waylaid and killed Hebert and Betram Francis and destroyed any evidence of the crime. The Jesuit organization believes that he is definitely dead due to foul play.

See also
Other notable clergy killed during the Sri Lankan civil war
George Jeyarajasingham
Chandra Fernando
Nihal Jim Brown
Mary Bastian
Mariampillai Sarathjeevan
List of people who disappeared

References

External links
List of matyred Jesuits
SRI LANKA: Father Eugene Hebet and Betram Francis

1923 births
1990 deaths
1990s missing person cases
20th-century American Jesuits
American emigrants to Sri Lanka
American people murdered abroad
American Roman Catholic missionaries
American Roman Catholic priests
Catholics from Louisiana
Missing people
Missing person cases in Sri Lanka
People from Jennings, Louisiana
People murdered in Sri Lanka
Roman Catholic missionaries in Sri Lanka
Sri Lankan Jesuits